Fall in Love & Songs is the tenth studio album by Fish Leong. It was released on 16 January 2009 by B'in Music.

According to Taiwan's G-Music chart the album is the fifth best selling album in Taiwan in 2009.

Album
The album includes "Don't Shed Any More Tears for Him" (track 1), TTV idol drama My Queen'''s theme song "There's No If" (track 2), which is a Chinese translated version of Thelma Aoyama's "Soba ni Iru ne", and TVBS drama I Do? theme song "Belonging to" (track 9). "PK" (track 4) is a duet with fellow Malaysian singer-songwriter Gary Chaw from Rock Records. The limited deluxe edition of this album is packaged in a gift box with four posters and a bonus CD with duets with Leo Ku, who previously played in Chinese drama Romance in the Rain'' with Zhao Wei, as well with Crowd Lu and Victor Wong.

Track listing

References

Fish Leong albums
2009 albums
Universal Music Taiwan albums
Mandopop albums